Since the invention of the floppy disk drive, various standardized form factors have been used in computing systems. Standardized form factors and interface allow a variety of peripherals and upgrades thereto with no impact to the physical size of a computer system. Drives may slot into a drive bay of the corresponding size.

Compared to flash drives in same form factor, maximum rotating disk drive capacity is much smaller, with 100 TB , and 32 TB for 2.5-inch.

List 

IBM's first hard drive, the IBM 350, used a stack of fifty 24-inch platters and was of a size comparable to two large refrigerators. In 1962, IBM introduced its model 1311 disk, which used six 14-inch (nominal size) platters in a removable pack and was roughly the size of a washing machine. This became a standard platter size and drive form-factor for many years, used also by other manufacturers. The IBM 2314 used platters of the same size in an eleven-high pack and introduced the "drive in a drawer" layout, although the "drawer" was not the complete drive.

Later drives were designed to fit entirely into a chassis that would mount in a 19-inch rack. Digital's RK05 and RL01 were early examples using single 14-inch platters in removable packs, the entire drive fitting in a 10.5-inch-high rack space (six rack units). In the mid-to-late 1980s the similarly sized Fujitsu Eagle, which used (coincidentally) 10.5-inch platters, was a popular product.

Such large platters were never used with microprocessor-based systems. With increasing sales of microcomputers having built in floppy-disk drives (FDDs), HDDs that would fit to the FDD mountings became desirable. Thus HDD Form factors, initially followed those of 8-inch, 5.25-inch, and 3.5-inch floppy disk drives. Because there were no smaller floppy disk drives, smaller HDD form factors developed from product offerings or industry standards.

 8-inch
  ×  ×  ( ×  × ). In 1979, Shugart Associates' SA1000 was the first form factor compatible HDD, having the same dimensions and a compatible interface to the 8" FDD.
 5.25-inch
 5.75 in × 3.25 in × 8 in (146.1 mm × 82.55 mm × 203 mm). This smaller form factor, first used in an HDD by Seagate in 1980, was the same size as full-height  FDD, 3.25-inches high. This is twice as high as "half height"; i.e., 1.63 in (41.4 mm). Most desktop models of drives for optical 120 mm disks (DVD, CD) use the half height 5¼" dimension, but it fell out of fashion for HDDs. The format was standardized as EIA-741 and co-published as SFF-8501 for disk drives, with other SFF-85xx series standards covering related 5.25 inch devices (optical drives, etc.) The Quantum Bigfoot HDD was the last to use it in the late 1990s, with "low-profile" (≈25 mm) and "ultra-low-profile" (≈20 mm) high versions.
 3.5-inch
 4 in × 1 in × 5.75 in (101.6 mm × 25.4 mm × 146 mm) = 376.77344 cm³. This smaller form factor is similar to that used in an HDD by Rodime in 1983, which was the same size as the "half height" 3½" FDD, i.e., 1.63 inches high. Today, the 1-inch high ("slimline" or "low-profile") version of this form factor is the most popular form used in most desktops. The format was standardized in terms of dimensions and positions of mounting holes as EIA/ECA-740, co-published as SFF-8301.  At least Seagate made 19.99-mm-high drives too.  At least Samsung made a low-profile single-disc drive with a height of only 18.288 mm (0.72 in).
 2.5-inch
  × 0.197– ×  ( × 5– × ) = 34.925–. This smaller form factor was introduced by PrairieTek in 1988; there is no corresponding FDD. The 2.5-inch drive format is standardized in the EIA/ECA-720 co-published as SFF-8201; when used with specific connectors, more detailed specifications are SFF-8212 for the 50-pin (ATA laptop) connector, SFF-8223 with the SATA, or SAS connector and SFF-8222 with the SCA-2 connector.
 It came to be widely used for HDDs in mobile devices (laptops, music players, etc.) and for solid-state drives (SSDs), by 2008 replacing some 3.5 inch enterprise-class drives. It is also used in the PlayStation 3 and Xbox 360 video game consoles.
 Drives 9.5 mm high became an unofficial standard for all except the largest-capacity laptop drives (usually having two platters inside); 12.5 mm-high drives, typically with three platters, are used for maximum capacity, but will not fit most laptop computers. Enterprise-class drives can have a height up to 15 mm. Seagate released a 7 mm drive aimed at entry level laptops and high end netbooks in December 2009. Western Digital released on April 23, 2013 a hard drive 5 mm in height specifically aimed at Ultrabooks.
 1.8-inch
 54 mm × 8 mm × 78.5 mm = 33.912 cm³. This form factor, originally introduced by Integral Peripherals in 1993, evolved into the ATA-7 ZIF with dimensions as stated but with a total length of 71mm. Later the micro SATA interface made the total length 78.5mm. The 1.8 inch form factor was used in digital audio players and subnotebooks with a ZIF connector. Later the 1.8 inch form factor drives were updated with a micro SATA connector and the largest drive made was 320GB (Toshiba MK3233GSG). The 1.8 inch form factor was eventually phased out as SSD drives became cheaper to produce and could be built directly onto PCBs to save space. There was an attempt to standardize this format as SFF-8123, but it was cancelled in 2005. SATA revision 2.6 standardized the internal Micro SATA connector and device dimensions.
 1.3-inch
 51 mm x 43.8 mm x 10.5 mm. This form factor was used by HP C3013A, named HP Kittyhawk microdrive, introduced in June 1992.
 1-inch
 42.8 mm × 5 mm × 36.4 mm. This form factor was introduced in 1999, as IBM's Microdrive to fit inside a CF Type II slot. Samsung calls the same form factor "1.3 inch" drive in its product literature.
 0.85-inch
 24 mm × 5 mm × 32 mm. Toshiba announced this form factor in January 2004 for use in mobile phones and similar applications, including SD/MMC slot compatible HDDs optimized for video storage on 4G handsets. Toshiba manufactured a 4 GB (MK4001MTD) and an 8 GB (MK8003MTD) version and holds the Guinness World Record for the smallest HDD.

, 2.5-inch and 3.5-inch hard disks were the most popular sizes.

By 2009, all manufacturers had discontinued the development of new products for the 1.3-inch, 1-inch and 0.85-inch form factors due to falling prices of flash memory, which has no moving parts.

While these sizes are customarily described by an approximately correct figure in inches, actual sizes have long been specified in millimeters. The older 3.5-inch form factor uses UNC threads, while 2.5-inch drives use metric M3 threads.

Notes

References

Rotating disc computer storage media